Joseph C. Smith (1875–1932) was an American dancer and choreographer.

He introduced tango to the United States in 1911. In a letter to the New York Times he claimed that he introduced it at the Winter Garden Theatre, dancing with Dorothy Jardon, in the show called Review of 1911.  He was the son of George Washington Smith (1820-1899), America's first male ballet star.

Notes and references

Related articles 
 Turkey Trot (dance)
 Apache (dance)

See also
Carlos G. Groppa, The Tango in the United States, a History, McFarland & Company, Jefferson, North Carolina, 2004, 

Tango dancers
1875 births
1932 deaths
19th-century American dancers
20th-century American dancers